Unova or UNOVA may refer to:

 Unova region, a fictional Pokémon setting
 Intermec, previously UNOVA, inc.